Splashdown is a water racing video game developed by Rainbow Studios and published by Infogrames originally for the PlayStation 2 and was later ported to the Xbox. It was released under the Atari brand name.

It received a sequel, Splashdown: Rides Gone Wild, in 2003, and was published by Rainbow Studios' new owner THQ.

Gameplay
Splashdown is quite similar to Nintendo's Wave Race series and Sony Computer Entertainment America's Jet Moto franchise. Players gain control of a personal water craft as they race against each other on various courses. Players must pass through correct sides of buoys in each racetrack, or the personal water craft may stall as a penalty.

Reception

Splashdown received "generally favorable reviews" on both platforms according to the review aggregation website Metacritic. In Japan, Famitsu gave it a score of 28 out of 40 for PlayStation 2 version. It was nominated for GameSpots 2001 "Best In-Game Water" prize among console games, which went to Wave Race: Blue Storm. The 2002 Xbox version was a runner-up for GameSpots annual "Best Driving Game on Xbox" award.

See also
Splashdown: Rides Gone Wild

References

External links
 

2001 video games
Atari games
Embracer Group franchises
Multiplayer and single-player video games
Personal watercraft racing video games
PlayStation 2 games
Rainbow Studios games
Video games developed in the United States
Xbox games